Medvedkovo is a Moscow Metro station in Severnoye Medvedkovo District, North-Eastern Administrative Okrug, Moscow. It is on the Kaluzhsko-Rizhskaya Line serving as its northeastern terminus. The station opened on 29 September 1978.

Design 
The architects Nina Aleshina and Natalya Samoilova designed Medvedkovo station. It features flared  pillars faced with pinkish marble and strips of stainless steel. The outer walls of the station are coated with red marble and interlocking triangles of anodized aluminum punctuated with plaques by M. Alekseev depicting northern wildlife.

Entrances to the station are located on either side of Shirokaya street just west of Grekova Street.

Moscow Metro stations
Railway stations in Russia opened in 1978
Kaluzhsko-Rizhskaya Line
Railway stations located underground in Russia